Rickmansworth Cricket Club is one of the oldest cricket clubs in England. The badge denotes a founding date of 1787, however there are records of games prior to this, one in particular between the club and Pinner in 1760.

It is known there was a match between Rickmansworth and Pinner in 1790 in which 7 Rickmansworth Batsmen were run out. The local Paper, the Watford Observer, noted that this was due, in no small part, to 'an excess of Beef and Beer prior to the match'. 

In the early days the club was based at the south end of Rickmansworth near where the White Bear Pub is today. In 1803, Rickmansworth hosted its only 1st class game to date. HC Woolridge's XI v WR Capel's XI. Clifford's Park, Rickmansworth. 26 August 1803. It is unclear where the Clifford's Park ground was situated in Rickmansworth. The primary player in the game was Lord Frederick Beauclerk, one of the best single-wicket cricketers of his time. His under-arm bowling was very slow, but extremely accurate - and he could get the ball to rise abruptly off a length. Beauclerk was the second president of the MCC in 1826. The Captain of one team was William Capel 

A few years later the club relocated to Rickmansworth Park, opposite the Met Station, which is now the grounds of the Royal Masonic School for Girls. In the middle of the 19th century, the club moved to its present ground at Park Road and functioned from a wooden pavilion which provided accommodation only for serving refreshments and for teams to change their attire. A score book dated 1881–1883, has been preserved, and in this score book there are details of a match with an England team. The overs were 4 ball overs at the time, and teams rarely scored more than 100 and often batted twice in a day.

From this time onwards Rickmansworth were one of the top club sides in the South of England. In 1881 they played an England XI and won by 9 wickets, despite the England team containing Billy Midwinter, famous as being the only player to represent England and Australia in Test matches. 

In 1882 Rickmansworth again hosted an All England team of professional players preparing to face the touring Australians 9 days later. Rickmansworth (fielding 18 players against the England Eleven) were defeated by 128 runs, but the England team went on to lose the most famous of matches, the original ‘Ashes’, at the Oval just over a week later.  The same Ashes which are so keenly contested to this day.  

A local guide circulated in Rickmansworth about 1912 contained an article by Mr Tom Bevan, the headmaster of the Boys Elementary School from about 1890, giving details of some of his researches at Lords. In this article it is stated that the Rickmansworth Club played an England team at the Lords ground in 1807 – that is before the Battle of Waterloo.

The cricket ground was actually the property of Salters Brewery, which was situated on both sides of the road near where the Joan of Arc Roman Catholic School now stands. Access to the field was by a road where the Roman Catholic Church now stands and continuing on the left of the old Malt House, now known as St Augustine's Hall.

The old wooden pavilion, situated where the Cricket nets are now, had a small lawn in front of it, enclosed by an iron fence and only males were allowed to enter.

After the Great War the cricket field was again put into condition for play to be resumed, In early 1920 Salters Brewery was taken over by one of the large Brewery firms, and the threat of the Club losing the ground it had used for such a long time was very real. It was then that Mr Francis William Reckitt, who was a grandson of the founders of the Reckitt & Sons business, an artist, who had lived in the town since 1904, stepped in and bought the whole property. He then had a modern club house erected as now, a hockey field laid out on what is now the 3rd team pitches, replacing the bowling greens, and hard and grass lawn tennis courts constructed. The hard courts were where the car park is today and you can still see the brick built surrounds. Of course there were few cars in those days so no need for a car park.

The Club now provided facilities for cricket, bowls, lawn tennis and hockey and when the club house was officially opened on 2 February 1924, it then assumed the title of the Rickmansworth Cricket and Sports Club. William Reckitt set the property and grounds in Trust providing Sport was always played on the grounds. 

A cricket team functioned throughout the Second World War of 1939-1945 and the cricket field was kept properly cut and the actual playing pitch of the hockey field was not allowed to grow wild. This was only possible because of an arrangement with the Hertfordshire County Council giving them sole use of the greater part of the club house as a children's nursery, and the financial arrangements made with the County during the war, and compensation when the war was ended enabled the Club to pay its way and accumulate a small surplus.

Since the War the club started a steady decline from being a premier County side to, by the 1970s a club in a downward spiral. By the early 1980s the club house was altered to accommodate an upstairs changing room and the downstairs kitchen and garden, which had existed for the use of the club professional from the 1930s to the 1960s, was removed. By the mid-1980s the club languished in the bottom division in Hertfordshire Cricket and the two Saturday and two Sunday teams was reduced to barely 1 team on each day. The Club considered a move to the Thames Valley League but decided to stay in the Hertfordshire set-up.

In the 1990s the club started to attract new players again and won the 3rd Division and 2nd Division of the Saracens Herts Cricket League in successive years. The 2nd team were promoted also in 1995 and 1998. More recently the 1st XI and 2nd XI won successive promotions in 2018 and 2019 to now represent the club in Divisions 4 and 6 of the Saracens Herts Cricket League. 

In modern times the club is now a flourishing cornerstone of the community offering cricket for up to 5 teams playing Hertfordshire League Cricket and at least one team on Sundays. Just as importantly there is a growing Youth Cricket Section and a number of the youngsters now represent the District, Area and County in Cricket.

References

External links
 Official website

1787 establishments in England
English club cricket teams
Sports clubs established in the 1780s
Rickmansworth